The Republic of Suriname has a number of forms of transport. Transportation emissions are an increasing part of Suriname's contributions to climate change, as part of the Nationally Determined Contributions for the Paris Agreement, Suriname has committed to emissions controls for vehicles and increased public transit investment.

Railways
Railways, total: 166 km single track.
standard gauge: 80 km  gauge in West-Suriname, but not in use. This stretch was constructed as part of the West Suriname Plan.
narrow gauge: 86 km  gauge Lawa Railway from Onverwacht to Sarakreek, currently not in use. In 2014, a plan had been announced to reopen the line between Onverwacht and Paramaribo Central Station. The intention was for the line to be extended onto Paramaribo Adolf Pengel Airport, but as of May 2020, the project has not started.

Rail links with adjacent countries
 None

Highways

Statistics
 total: 4,304 km (2003)
 paved: 1,119 km (2003)
 highway: 9.6 km (2020)
 unpaved: 3,174 km (2003)

NOTE: Driving is on the left. Suriname and its neighbour Guyana are the only two countries on the (in-land) American continent which still drive on the left.

Road links with adjacent countries

  Guyana - Yes, ferry from Nieuw-Nickerie to Corriverton.
  Brazil - None.
  French Guiana - Yes, ferry from Albina to Saint-Laurent-du-Maroni.

Waterways
1,200 km; most important means of transport; oceangoing vessels with drafts ranging up to 7 m can navigate many of the principal waterways.

Ports and harbours
 Albina
 Moengo
 Nieuw-Nickerie
 Paramaribo: Jules Sedney Harbour is the main harbour for cargo. 
 Paramaribo: Waterkant is used by ferries. 
 Paranam
 Wageningen

Merchant marine
total: 10 ships.
ships by type: (2018)
 cargo ship 5
 petroleum tanker 3
 other 2

Airports
 55 (2013)
 List of airports in Suriname

Paved runways
 total: 6
 over 3,047 m: 1
 under 914 m: 5 (2013)

Unpaved runways
 total: 49
 914 to 1,523 m: 4
 under 914 m: 45 (2013)

See also

 Rail transport by country

References

External links